Martín Carrillo Alderete (died 29 June 1653) was a Roman Catholic prelate who served as Archbishop of Granada (1641–1653), Bishop of Osma (1636–1641), and Bishop of Oviedo (1633–1636).

Biography
Martín Carrillo Alderete was born in Toledo, Spain.
On 10 January 1633, he was appointed during the papacy of Pope Urban VIII as Bishop of Oviedo.
On 20 May 1633, he was consecrated bishop by Domingo Pimentel Zúñiga, Bishop of Osma, with Juan Bravo Lagunas, Bishop Emeritus of Ugento, and Cristóforo Chrisostome Carletti, Bishop of Termia, serving as co-consecrators.
On 9 June 1636, he was appointed during the papacy of Pope Urban VIII as Bishop of Osma.
On 1 July 1641, he was appointed during the papacy of Pope Urban VIII as Archbishop of Granada.
He served as Archbishop of Granada until his death on 29 June 1653.

Episcopal succession
While bishop, he was the principal consecrator of:
Cristóbal Guzmán Santoyo, Bishop of Palencia (1634); 
Juan Valenzuela Velázquez, Bishop of Salamanca (1642); 
and the principal co-consecrator of:
Gonzalo Chacón Velasco y Fajardo, Bishop of Calahorra y La Calzada (1633).

See also
Catholic Church in Spain

References

External links and additional sources
 (for Chronology of Bishops) 
 (for Chronology of Bishops) 
 (for Chronology of Bishops) 
 (for Chronology of Bishops) 
 (for Chronology of Bishops) 
 (for Chronology of Bishops) 

17th-century Roman Catholic bishops in Spain
Bishops appointed by Pope Urban VIII
1576 births
1653 deaths
Archbishops of Granada